Avigdor "Avi" Maoz (born 6 July 1956) is an Israeli civil servant and politician. The leader of the far-right Noam party, he is currently its sole member in the Knesset.

Biography
Maoz was born Avigdor Fischheimer in the Kiryat Shmuel neighborhood of Haifa. He is the son of Holocaust survivors Esther and Israel Fischheimer. In 1975 he enlisted in the IDF and in 1977, he was a partner in establishing the settlement Migdal Oz in Gush Etzion, and was later the secretary of the Kibbutz. Between 1980 and 1991, he studied at a yeshiva.

Early career 
Maoz was appointed Director of the Ministry of Interior by Natan Sharansky in 1999, and subsequently became director of the Ministry of Housing under minister Effi Eitam. He also served as the director-general of Yisrael BaAliyah.

Political career 
Maoz became leader of the Noam party after its establishment in 2019. He and Noam campaign on Israel's "Jewish identity", which Maoz argues should be a far-right interpretation of Orthodox Judaism, and against secularism and Reform Judaism. He has campaigned heavily against LGBT rights, calling for a ban on Pride parades and the legalisation of conversion therapy. He is against women serving in the Israel Defense Forces, and has called for increased gender segregation in public events.

Prior to the 2021 Knesset elections he was placed sixth on the Religious Zionist Party list, and was elected to the Knesset as the party won six seats.

He was re-elected in the 2022 Knesset elections as part of the Religious Zionism Party, though the party split into three factions on 20 November 2022. An agreement signed on 27 November 2022 will appoint Maoz a deputy minister in the coalition under Benjamin Netanyahu. As part of the agreement, Maoz will head a new organization focused on Jewish identity, which will include control of Nativ, a body which administers immigration from former Soviet countries. Maoz has said he wishes to change Israel's Law of Return to exclude non-Jewish grandchildren of Jews and recognise only Orthodox conversions to Judaism for migration. Maoz's appointment went into effect on 3 January 2023.

On 27 February 2023, Maoz announced his intention to resign as deputy minister, claiming the government did not intend on fulfilling Noam's coalition agreeement with Likud. his resignation went into effect on 1 March.

Personal life 
Maoz lives in Jerusalem, is married and has ten children.

References

External links

1956 births
Living people
20th-century Israeli civil servants
21st-century Israeli civil servants
Israeli Orthodox Jews
Jewish Israeli politicians
Leaders of political parties in Israel
Members of the 24th Knesset (2021–2022)
Members of the 25th Knesset (2022–)
Noam (political party) politicians
Politicians from Haifa
Religious Zionist Party politicians